The escort carrier or escort aircraft carrier (U.S. hull classification symbol CVE), also called a "jeep carrier" or "baby flattop" in the United States Navy (USN) or "Woolworth Carrier" by the Royal Navy, was a small and slow type of aircraft carrier used by the Royal Navy, the United States Navy, the Imperial Japanese Navy and Imperial Japanese Army Air Force in World War II. They were typically half the length and a third the displacement of larger fleet carriers, slower, more-lightly armed and armored, and carried fewer planes.  Escort carriers were most often built upon a commercial ship hull, so they were cheaper and could be built quickly. This was their principal advantage as they could be completed in greater numbers as a stop-gap when fleet carriers were scarce. However, the lack of protection made escort carriers particularly vulnerable, and several were sunk with great loss of life. The light carrier (U.S. hull classification symbol CVL) was a similar concept to the escort carrier in most respects, but was fast enough to operate alongside fleet carriers.

Escort carriers were too slow to keep up with the main forces consisting of fleet carriers, battleships, and cruisers. Instead, they were used to escort merchant ship convoys, defending them from enemy threats such as submarines and planes. In the invasions of mainland Europe and Pacific islands, escort carriers provided air support to ground forces during amphibious operations. Escort carriers also served as backup aircraft transports for fleet carriers, and ferried aircraft of all military services to points of delivery.

In the Battle of the Atlantic, escort carriers were used to protect convoys against U-boats. Initially escort carriers accompanied the merchant ships and helped to fend off attacks from aircraft and submarines. As numbers increased later in the war, escort carriers also formed part of hunter-killer groups that sought out submarines instead of being attached to a particular convoy.

In the Pacific theater, CVEs provided air support of ground troops in the Battle of Leyte Gulf. They lacked the speed and weapons to counter enemy fleets, relying on the protection of a Fast Carrier Task Force. However, at the Battle off Samar, one U.S. task force of escort carriers and destroyers managed to successfully defend itself against a much larger Japanese force of battleships and cruisers. The Japanese met a furious defense of carrier aircraft, screening destroyers, and destroyer escorts.

Of the 151 aircraft carriers built in the U.S. during World War II, 122 were escort carriers, though no examples survive. The  was the most numerous class of aircraft carrier, with 50 launched.

Development
In the early 1920s, the Washington Naval Treaty imposed limits on the maximum size and total tonnage of aircraft carriers for the five main naval powers. Later treaties largely kept these provisions. As a result, construction between the World Wars had been insufficient to meet operational needs for aircraft carriers as World War II expanded from Europe. Too few fleet carriers were available to simultaneously transport aircraft to distant bases, support amphibious invasions, offer carrier landing training for replacement pilots, conduct anti-submarine patrols, and provide defensive air cover for deployed battleships and cruisers. The foregoing mission requirements limited use of fleet carriers' unique offensive strike capability demonstrated at the Battle of Taranto and the Attack on Pearl Harbor. Conversion of existing ships (and hulls under construction for other purposes) provided additional aircraft carriers until new construction became available.

Conversions of cruisers and passenger liners with speed similar to fleet carriers were identified by the U.S. as "light aircraft carriers" (hull classification symbol CVL) able to operate at battle fleet speeds. Slower conversions were classified as "escort carriers" and were considered naval auxiliaries suitable for pilot training and transport of aircraft to distant bases.

The Royal Navy had recognized a need for carriers to defend its trade routes in the 1930s. While designs had been prepared for "trade protection carriers" and five suitable liners identified for conversion, nothing further was done mostly because there were insufficient aircraft for even the fleet carriers under construction at the time. For defense from German aircraft, convoys were supplied first with fighter catapult ships and CAM ships that could carry a single (disposable) fighter. In the interim, before escort carriers could be supplied, they also brought in merchant aircraft carriers that could operate four aircraft.

In 1940, U.S. Admiral William Halsey recommended construction of naval auxiliaries for pilot training. In early 1941 the British asked the U.S. to build on their behalf six carriers of an improved Audacity design, but the U.S. had already begun their own escort carrier. On 1 February 1941, the United States Chief of Naval Operations gave priority to construction of naval auxiliaries for aircraft transport. U.S. ships built to meet these needs were initially referred to as auxiliary aircraft escort vessels (AVG) in February 1942 and then auxiliary aircraft carrier (ACV) on 5 August 1942. Operation Torch and North Atlantic anti-submarine warfare proved these ships capable aircraft carriers for ship formations moving at the speed of trade or amphibious invasion convoys. U.S. classification revision to escort aircraft carrier (CVE) on 15 July 1943 reflected upgraded status from auxiliary to combatant. They were informally known as "Jeep carriers" or "baby flattops". It was quickly found that the escort carriers had better performance than light carriers, which tended to pitch badly in moderate to high seas. The  was designed to incorporate the best features of American CVLs on a more stable hull with a less expensive propulsion system.

Among their crews, CVE was sarcastically said to stand for "Combustible, Vulnerable, and Expendable", and the CVEs were called “Kaiser coffins" in honor of Casablanca-class manufacturer Henry J. Kaiser. Magazine protection was minimal in comparison to fleet aircraft carriers.  was sunk within minutes by a single torpedo, and  exploded from undetermined causes with very heavy loss of life. Three escort carriers—,  and —were destroyed by kamikazes, the largest ships to meet such a fate.

The aircraft hangar typically ran only  of the way under the flight deck and housed a combination of 24–30 fighters and bombers organized into one single "composite squadron". By comparison, a late Essex-class fleet carrier of the period could carry 103 aircraft organized into separate fighter, bomber and torpedo-bomber squadrons.

The island (superstructure) on these ships was small and cramped, and located well forward of the funnels (unlike on a normal-sized carrier, where the funnels were integrated into the island). Although the first escort carriers had only one aircraft elevator, having two elevators (one fore and one aft), along with the single aircraft catapult, quickly became standard. The carriers employed the same system of arresting cables and tail hooks as on the big carriers, and procedures for launch and recovery were the same as well.

U.S. escort carriers were large enough to have facilities such as a permanent canteen or snack bar, called a gedunk bar, in addition to the mess. The bar was open for longer hours than the mess and sold several flavors of ice cream, along with cigarettes and other consumables. There were also several vending machines available on board.

In all, 130 Allied escort carriers were launched or converted during the war. The remaining escort carriers were U.S.-built. The Bogue-class carriers were based on the hull of the Type C3 cargo ship.

Royal Navy

Originally developed at the behest of the United Kingdom to operate as part of a North Atlantic convoy escort, rather than as part of a naval strike force, many of the  escort carriers produced were assigned to the Royal Navy for the duration of the war under the Lend-Lease act. They supplemented and then replaced the converted merchant aircraft carriers that were put into service by the British and Dutch as an emergency measure until dedicated escort carriers became available. As convoy escorts, they were used by the Royal Navy to provide air scouting, to ward off enemy long-range scouting aircraft and, increasingly, to spot and hunt submarines. Often additional escort carriers joined convoys, not as fighting ships but as transporters, ferrying aircraft from the U.S. to Britain; twice as many aircraft could be carried by storing aircraft on the flight deck as well as in the hangar.

The ships sent to the Royal Navy were slightly modified, partly to suit the traditions of that service. Among other things the ice-cream making machines were removed, since they were considered unnecessary luxuries on ships which provided a grog ration. The heavy duty washing machines of the laundry room were removed, since "all a British sailor needs to keep clean is a bucket and a bar of soap" (quoted from Warrilow).

Other modifications were due to the need for a completely enclosed hangar when operating in the North Atlantic and in support of the Arctic convoys.

U.S. Navy service

The attack on Pearl Harbor brought up an urgent need for aircraft carriers, so some T3 tankers were converted to escort carriers;  is an example of how a T3 tanker hull, AO-33, was rebuilt to be an escort carrier. The T3 tanker size and speed made the T3 a useful escort carrier. There were two classes of T3 hull carriers: Sangamon class and Commencement Bay class.

The U.S. discovered their own uses for escort carriers. In the North Atlantic, they supplemented the escorting destroyers by providing air support for anti-submarine warfare.

In the Pacific theater, escort carriers lacked the speed to sail with fast carrier attack groups, so were often tasked to escort the landing ships and troop carriers during the island-hopping campaign. In this role they provided air cover for the troopships and flew the first wave of attacks on beach fortifications in amphibious landing operations. On occasion, they even escorted the large carriers, serving as emergency airstrips and providing fighter cover for their larger sisters while these were busy readying or refueling their own planes. They also transported aircraft and spare parts from the U.S. to remote island airstrips.

Battle off Samar

A battle in which escort carriers played a major role was the Battle off Samar in the Philippines on 25 October 1944. The Japanese lured Admiral William Halsey, Jr. into chasing a decoy fleet with his powerful 3rd Fleet. This left about 450 aircraft from 16 small and slow escort carriers in three task units ("Taffies"), armed primarily to bomb ground forces, and their protective screen of destroyers and slower destroyer escorts to protect undefended troop and supply ships in Leyte Gulf. No Japanese threat was believed to be in the area, but a force of four battleships, including the formidable , eight cruisers, and 11 destroyers, appeared, sailing towards Leyte Gulf. Only the Taffies were in the way of the Japanese attack.

The slow carriers could not outrun  cruisers. They launched their aircraft and maneuvered to avoid shellfire, helped by smoke screens, for over an hour. "Taffy 3" bore the brunt of the fight. The Taffy ships took dozens of hits, mostly from armor-piercing rounds that passed right through their thin, unarmored hulls without exploding. , sunk in this action, was the only U.S. carrier lost to enemy surface gunfire in the war; the Japanese concentration of fire on this one carrier assisted the escape of the others. The carriers' only substantial armament—aside from their aircraft—was a single  dual-purpose gun mounted on the stern, but the pursuing Japanese cruisers closed to within range of these guns. One of the guns damaged the burning Japanese heavy cruiser , and a subsequent bomb dropped by an aircraft hit the cruiser's forward machinery room, leaving her dead in the water. A kamikaze attack sank ; kamikaze aircraft attacking other ships were shot down. Ultimately the superior Japanese surface force withdrew, believing they were confronted by a stronger force than was the case. Most of the damage to the Japanese fleet was inflicted by torpedoes fired by destroyers, and bombs from the carriers' aircraft.

The U.S. Navy lost a similar number of ships and more men than in the battles of the Coral Sea and Midway combined (though major fleet carriers were lost in the other battles).

The ships

Many escort carriers were Lend-Leased to the United Kingdom, this list specifies the breakdown in service to each navy.

: Two ships, one in USN service and one in British service.
: Four ships, one mainly in USN service (as ) and three in British service.
: Four ships, all in USN service.
: 45 ships, 11 in USN service, 34 in British service as Attacker class (first group) and Ruler class (second group).
: 50 ships, all in USN service.
: 19 ships, all in USN service, including two that were accepted but not commissioned and laid up for many years after the war. Four more units were canceled and scrapped on the building slips. The Commencement Bay-class ships were seen as the finest escort carriers ever built, and several units continued in service after the war as training carriers, aircraft ferries and other auxiliary uses.

In addition, six escort carriers were converted from other types by the British during the war.

The table below lists escort carriers and similar ships performing the same missions. The first four were built as early fleet aircraft carriers. Merchant aircraft carriers (MAC) carried trade cargo in addition to operating aircraft. Aircraft transports carried larger numbers of planes by eliminating accommodation for operating personnel and storage of fuel and ammunition.

Relative carrier sizes in World War II

Post-World War II
The years following World War II brought many revolutionary new technologies to naval aviation, most notably the helicopter and the jet fighter, and with this a complete rethinking of its strategies and ships' tasks. Although several of the latest Commencement Bay-class CVE were deployed as floating airfields during the Korean War, the main reasons for the development of the escort carrier had disappeared or could be dealt with better by newer weapons. The emergence of the helicopter meant that helicopter-deck equipped frigates could now take over the CVE's role in a convoy while also performing their usual role as submarine hunters. Ship-mounted guided missile launchers took over much of the aircraft protection role, and in-flight refueling eliminated the need for floating stopover points for transport or patrol aircraft. Consequently, after the Commencement Bay class, no new escort carriers were designed, and with every downsizing of the navy, the CVEs were the first to be mothballed.

Several escort carriers were pressed back into service during the first years of the Vietnam War because of their ability to carry large numbers of aircraft. Redesignated AKV (air transport auxiliary), they were manned by a civilian crew and used to ferry whole aircraft and spare parts from the U.S. to Army, Air Force and Marine bases in South Vietnam. However, CVEs were useful in this role only for a limited period. Once all major aircraft were equipped with refueling probes, it became much easier to fly the aircraft directly to its base instead of shipping it.

The last chapter in the history of escort carriers consisted of two conversions: as an experiment,  was converted from an aircraft carrier into a pure helicopter carrier (CVHA-1) and used by the Marine Corps to carry assault helicopters for the first wave of amphibious warfare operations. Later, Thetis Bay became a full amphibious assault ship (LHP-6). Although in service only from 1955 (the year of her conversion) to 1964, the experience gained in her training exercises greatly influenced the design of today's amphibious assault ships.

In the second conversion, in 1961,  had all her aircraft handling equipment removed and four tall radio antennas installed on her long, flat deck. In lieu of aircraft, the hangar deck now had 24 military radio transmitter trucks bolted to its floor. Rechristened , the ship was used as a communication relay ship and served dutifully through the Vietnam War as a floating radio station, relaying transmissions between the forces on the ground and the command centers back home.

Unlike almost all other major classes of ships and patrol boats from World War II, most of which can be found in a museum or port, no escort carrier or American light carrier has survived; all were destroyed during the war or broken up in the following decades. The Dictionary of American Naval Fighting Ships records that the last former escort carrier remaining in naval service—USS Annapolis—was sold for scrapping 19 December 1979.

See also
For complete lists see:
List of escort carriers by country
List of United States Navy escort aircraft carriers
List of sunken aircraft carriers
List of escort carriers of the Royal Navy
List of ships of the Imperial Japanese Navy
List of aircraft carriers of World War II

Notes

References

Further reading

External links

Ship types
Aircraft carriers